Ludia Marguiela Montero Ramos (born 17 April 1999) is a Cuban weightlifter.

She competed in the women's 49 kg event at the 2019 Pan American Games held in Lima, Peru. She won a medal at the 2019 World Weightlifting Championships.

She represented Cuba at the 2020 Summer Olympics in Tokyo, Japan. She finished in 6th place in the women's 49 kg event.

References

External links
 

1999 births
Living people
Cuban female weightlifters
World Weightlifting Championships medalists
Pan American Weightlifting Championships medalists
Weightlifters at the 2019 Pan American Games
Pan American Games competitors for Cuba
Weightlifters at the 2020 Summer Olympics
Olympic weightlifters of Cuba
21st-century Cuban women